The Solar Lodge of the Ordo Templi Orientis was a magical organization in California that was established in 1965, and withdrew from initiatory activity in 1972. It was loosely based on ideas from the then-defunct Ordo Templi Orientis, but used the curriculum of the A.'.A.'. established by Aleister Crowley. 

The precursor to Solar Lodge was set in motion by Ray Burlingame ("Frater Aquarius"), when he initiated Georgina "Jean" Brayton ("Soror Capricornus") in 1962. Burlingame was a Ninth Degree member of Ordo Templi Orientis. The O.T.O. as re-founded by Grady McMurtry in 1969 has never accepted Solar Lodge as a valid body of O.T.O. and considers the Solar Lodge "clandestine", much as Freemasons consider the O.T.O. a form of clandestine Masonry.

In 1965, shortly before his death, Burlingame instructed Brayton to initiate other people, which she did, expanding Solar Lodge in the 1960s to include over 50 members. By 1967, the Lodge owned several small mansions, a gas station, a bookstore, all in Los Angeles, and a desert property known as Solar Ranch in the Sonoran desert.  In 1969, the Lodge ran a bookstore in Blythe, California; it operated Solar Ranch near Vidal, California; and it owned a gas station in Vidal with a cafe, motel, bar, house, gas station and grocery store.

In 1969, the members of the lodge were charged with mistreatment of the six-year-old son of one of the members in a case that came to be known as "The Boy in the Box".  Brayton, her husband, and other officers performed "interstate flight to avoid prosecution," traveled to Mexico and Canada, and eventually engaged in a publicity campaign that alleged a conspiracy against them by law enforcement officers and the courts.  Initially, a few members went to jail for 6 months on a felony conviction, a few went to jail for 3 months on a misdemeanor conviction, and a few had their charges dismissed. When Brayton and her husband were arrested, she pleaded no contest and was sentenced to three years of probation along with a $500 fine.

Notes

References
Los Angeles Times, "Boy in the Box" headline. July 30, 1969.
Frater Shiva. Inside the OTO. Allied Health & Science Institute. Los Angeles: (c)1974.
Charles Manson and the Solar Lodge background information about the Solar Lodge

Magical organizations
Ordo Templi Orientis
Secret societies in the United States